Coloni Motorsport, also known as Scuderia Coloni, was an auto racing team from Italy. They made 82 attempts to take part in a Formula One race but only qualified 14 times. Since then, under the management of Enzo Coloni's son Paolo, the team has been successful in Formula Three, Formula 3000 and GP2 Series. Between 2006 and 2009 the team ran under the name of Fisichella Motor Sport, with support from Formula One driver Giancarlo Fisichella and his manager Enrico Zanarini.

Origins of the team

The team was founded in 1983 by Enzo Coloni, a racing driver from Perugia, Italy. It is located in Passignano sul Trasimeno. Coloni competed during the 1970s and after participating in the Italian Formula 3 series for several years, he won the drivers' title in 1982 when he was 36 years old. Before that, Coloni, who was also called "the wolf" (a nickname that would later be reflected in his company's logo), had also taken part in two Formula Two races, one in 1980 with the San Remo team and another one in 1982 with the Minardi team. At the end of 1982, he gave up active racing and started managing his own team, initially in Italian Formula Three.

Formula Three and Formula 3000 (1983–1986)
Success came almost immediately: the team won the 1984 Italian Formula 3 championship with Ivan Capelli. In 1986, Coloni Motorsport appeared in Formula 3000, entering an out-dated March 85B with drivers like Nicola Larini and Gabriele Tarquini. The Formula 3000 attempt was unsuccessful. Nonetheless the team progressed to Formula One the next year.

Formula One (1987–1991)

Coloni-Ford (1987–1989)
The FIA's announcement that turbos would be banned from Formula One from 1989 - making the sport more affordable — was the trigger for Enzo Coloni to enter the category. Enzo Coloni Racing Car Systems made its first appearance in Formula One at the 1987 Italian Grand Prix in September 1987. The yellow painted FC187, powered by a Novamotor-prepared Cosworth DFZ, was a simple machine designed by former Dallara apprentice Roberto Ori. Coloni himself had carried out the shake-down drive but Nicola Larini was the race driver. The car was obviously not ready and Larini did not qualify. The Italian recorded Coloni’s first Formula One race start at the 1987 Spanish Grand Prix, although mechanical problems meant that he did not finish. The team did not fly to the end of year overseas races that year, so Larini’s retirement from the Spanish Grand Prix that year ended their first season. They were, of course, 16th and last in the Constructors Championship, because they were the only team without a finish.

The 1988 season was the team's first full season and started well. Although the "new" FC188 was almost identical to its predecessor, Coloni's new driver Gabriele Tarquini qualified regularly and finished 8th at the Canadian Grand Prix. This turned out to be Coloni's best result in Formula One. Due to a shortage of funds very little development work was carried out during the year. The team’s performance suffered as a result and qualification or even prequalification were no longer certain. The team scored no points this year, finishing again 15th, ahead of Osella, the new EuroBrun and the suffering Zakspeed Team.

Although money was tight for 1989, Coloni entered two cars for Roberto Moreno and French newcomer Pierre-Henri Raphanel. The FC188Bs were another update of the 1987 car, but were hard to handle and about 20 km/h slower than the rest of the grid. Nevertheless, both drivers were able to qualify for the Monaco Grand Prix. This was the only race participation of a Coloni in the first part of the season. In Canada, Coloni presented a new car (the Coloni C3) which was penned by former AGS engineer Christian Vanderpleyn. The C3 was a basically good design but the team suffered again from a complete lack of testing. This meant that the team often failed to find the right setup for the races. The team failed to qualify for most of the rest of the season — only in three cases, the debut of the Coloni C3, the 1989 Canadian Grand Prix, the 1989 British Grand Prix and at the Portuguese Grand Prix did Moreno qualify, in 26th, 23rd and 15th place respectively, after a developmental front wing was fitted for Estoril. Unfortunately for the team, he then collided with Eddie Cheever in the warm-up  and had to use the spare car. He did not finish the race as the engine blew up after a handful of laps. As results failed to arrive, the team was cut back throughout the year. After Vanderpleyn had left the team in September, Enzo Coloni took over the engineer's job himself but unsurprisingly this brought no improvement; neither did the new driver Enrico Bertaggia who replaced Raphanel for the last races. The team finished equal 18th and last with Zakspeed, because the EuroBrun team never qualified that year. The Portuguese Grand Prix proved to be the last qualification for a Coloni car.

Coloni-Subaru (1990)
An unexpected contract with Subaru, the automobile branch of Fuji Heavy Industries, brought substantial financial backing and additionally an exclusive "works" engine for free. The Japanese took over 51% of the Coloni team, paid the team's debts and supported the new alliance with a brand new, unique engine. It was a flat-12 engine which in fact was penned by Carlo Chiti. Chiti's Motori Moderni company at Novara had supplied V6 turbo engines for the Minardi team from 1985 to 1987, and in 1988 Chiti had penned a normally aspirated V12 engine that attracted Subaru. In late 1988, the Japanese commissioned Chiti to design a new Formula One engine with a "flat" layout — as used in their road cars — that was ready in the summer of 1989. The engine, now with a Subaru badge, was tested in a Minardi M188 chassis but due to a severe lack of power Minardi very soon lost interest. After a few months of searching, Subaru found the Coloni team. Eventually, the "Subaru Coloni" Team was founded with Enzo Coloni staying on board as the man responsible for operations.

By the beginning of 1990, the "Subaru" flat engine was not producing more than 500 bhp, so the Coloni Subaru was one of the least competitive machines regularly competing in Formula One in 1990 (eclipsed only by the even slower Life car). Subaru and Chiti agreed to build a new V12 engine for the summer of 1990 together with a completely new chassis, but in the meantime the flat engine was to be used by the "Coloni Subaru" Team in a carry-over chassis. Early in 1990, a handful of Enzo Coloni's mechanics worked on a single C3 and tried to put the Subaru engine in it. The work was not done until the day the FIA started shipping the Formula One material to Phoenix. In the pits at Phoenix, the car was assembled for the very first time and a short shakedown took place in the parking area of an American supermarket. On the prequalification day at Phoenix the Formula One world saw Coloni's "new" model C3B which wore a white, red and green livery, but without an airbox and with wide, long sidepods. Neither at Phoenix nor at any other race did Bertrand Gachot, Coloni's new driver, manage to prequalify the car. Although lacking aerodynamic downforce or the engine power necessary to be competitive, the C3 was described by Gachot (speaking in 2021) as "the most fun" car he drove during his F1 career. As the season went on, improvements were few and results stayed nowhere. Meanwhile, no success could be seen at Coloni's plant in Perugia where obviously nobody worked seriously on a new car. In May, Enzo Coloni was sacked by Subaru, but no improvement came. In June, the Japanese company withdrew completely and sold the team back to Enzo Coloni, debt free, but with no sponsors and no engines. By the German Grand Prix Coloni had arranged a supply of Ford-Cosworth engines, prepared by Langford & Peck. An improved car also appeared in Germany. The "new" Coloni C3C was little more than a 1989 C3 with minor aerodynamic changes. The car was quicker but not enough to achieve any serious results. Gachot was usually able to prequalify his car but the qualification for the race was still out of reach. At the end of the season, Coloni had not qualified for a single Grand Prix.

Coloni-Ford (1991)
For the 1991 season the team consisted of only six people, and would be the last time a Formula One team entered only one car during the entire season. The car was another version of the C3 from 1989 which had seen some detail work from students of the University of Perugia and which was now called a C4. Enzo Coloni had hoped for Andrea de Cesaris as his first driver, with his sponsorship from Marlboro. The Roman eventually took his experience and his money to Jordan Grand Prix. Coloni handed his single car to newcomer Pedro Chaves from Portugal who had just won the British Formula 3000 series in 1990. The car was out of date, fragile and hard to handle and Chaves was not familiar with most of the tracks. As a result, Chaves never escaped prequalification. Finally he quit the team after the Portuguese Grand Prix. For the following race, Coloni was unable to find a new driver, but for the last two races of the season, he employed Naoki Hattori, a Japanese driver with a very decent record in other formulae but with no experience in Formula One. The results did not improve.

By that time, Coloni had sold his team to Andrea Sassetti, who renamed it Andrea Moda Formula for 1992; the team would not be around at the end of the season after it was expelled and banned from Formula One.

Complete Formula One results
(key)

Formula Three (1991–1996)
The team had another stint in Formula 3 before eventually stepping up to Formula 3000. Paolo Colini drove for the team in the Italian Championship between 1991 and 1993, as well as finishing second in the 1993 Masters of Formula 3. Although Paolo left the Italian series to drive elsewhere, the team continued in Italian F3 until the end of 1996, when Esteban Tuero and Dino Morelli drove for them.

Formula 3000
Coloni Motorsport made the switch to International Formula 3000 in 1997. They made a breakthrough year in 2002, when Giorgio Pantano and Enrico Toccacelo drove for the team. Pantano finished the year as runner-up, with Toccacelo in ninth, taking three wins between them. Ricardo Sperafico and Zsolt Baumgartner drove for Coloni in 2003, with Sperafico finishing as series runner-up, while Baumgartner made his Formula One debut for Jordan Grand Prix at his home race — the 2003 Hungarian Grand Prix.

GP2 Series
The team continued to race in the Formula One feeder series — which was rebranded as the GP2 Series in 2005.

Fisichella Motor Sport International
At the end of 2005, Formula One driver Giancarlo Fisichella joined forces with Coloni. Fisichella Motor Sport had a team, run by Coloni, racing in the 2005 Italian Formula 3000 season. They won that title with Luca Filippi, who moved across to GP2 with FMSI in 2006. He was joined by Turkey's Jason Tahincioglu, who brought sponsorship from Petrol Ofisi. Filippi left the team after three rounds and was replaced by former Coloni driver Giorgio Pantano, who won three races later that season.

Former F1 driver Antônio Pizzonia joined Tahincioglu at the team for 2007, although he was dropped in favour of Adam Carroll after three rounds. Carroll went on to win two races during 2007, while Tahincioglu again struggled to score.

In 2008 the team ran in the colours of Fisichella's F1 team Force India. Roldán Rodríguez drove one car for the whole season, while driving duties in the second car were shared between Adrián Vallés, Carroll and Marko Asmer. Andy Soucek was initially signed to drive for the team, but was replaced by Rodríguez shortly before the start of the season.

Fisichella International Racing surprisingly returned to racing via the 2014 Auto GP season, having replaced the short-lived Eurotech Engineering entry midway through the season at Round 5 in Imola. Fielding an all Italian line-up of Kevin Giovesi and Salvatore de Plano for 2014, the team managed three 2nd place finishes, all achieved by Giovesi, with de Plano's best result being 6th at the Red Bull Ring sprint race. For the 2015 season, neither Giovesi or de Plano were retained, instead, FMS brought in Italian Euroformula Open Championship driver Leonardo Pulcini for Hungary, along with Argentinian GP2 refugee Facu Regalia, who won the opening feature race, with Pulcini taking second in the sprint race, ahead of Regalia, who finished in 6th place. Only one car was run for Regalia in round 2 in Silverstone, before the 2015 season was folded due to low entry numbers, marking the end of the FMS name.

Along with the FMS entry in Auto GP, Scuderia Coloni itself also entered the series in 2015, under the Paolo Coloni Racing name. Swiss Ex-Zele Racing driver Christof von Grünigen was signed to the team, and later joined by Italian Loris Spinelli.

Coloni buyout
Andreas Zuber and Luiz Razia joined the team for 2009. After the sixth round of the season, the Coloni team took back full control of the team after buying out Fisichella. It also had a new sponsorship deal with PartyPokerRacing.com. The deal also applies to their Formula BMW Europe team.

At the following round of the championship, Coloni's cars were impounded as a result of an injunction obtained by Soucek as part of his dispute with the team in its FMSI guise.  The team missed the qualifying session and were thus ruled out of competing in either of the weekend's races.

Departure from GP2
At the Silverstone round of the 2012 GP2 championship, series organisers and Scuderia Coloni announced that the team would leave the series at the end of the 2012 season, and that the team would forfeit all of their points they had received to date and would receive for the remainder of the season. No further explanation was given for their abrupt departure.

Results

GP2 Series

† Includes points scored for other teams.
‡ Started the season as Fisichella Motor Sport

In detail 
(key) (Races in bold indicate pole position) (Races in italics indicate fastest lap)

Superleague Formula

References

External links
 Official website
 Fisichella Motor Sport

Italian auto racing teams
International Formula 3000 teams
GP2 Series teams
Superleague Formula teams
Formula BMW teams
FIA European Formula 3 Championship teams
Auto GP teams
Italian Formula 3 teams
Formula 3 Euro Series teams
Auto racing teams established in 1983
1983 establishments in Italy
2015 disestablishments in Italy
Auto racing teams disestablished in 2015